Al-Ittihad Sports Club is a Bahraini football club based in Bilad Al Qadeem.

In 2017/18 season was in 9th position in First division and after season was relegated to Second Division.

References

External links
Club Page in FIFA Website

Football clubs in Bahrain
Association football clubs established in 1952
1950s establishments in Bahrain